The 22nd edition of the Men's Asian Amateur Boxing Championships were held from January 11 to January 18, 2004 in Puerto Princesa Coliseum, Puerto Princesa, Philippines. The tournament served as a qualification event for the 2004 Summer Olympics in Athens.

In the light flyweight, flyweight, bantamweight and featherweight divisions, the top three performers gained Olympic qualification. From lightweight to light-heavy weight, the top two boxers qualified while only the winners of the heavyweight and super heavyweight divisions progressed to the Olympics.

Medal summary

Medal table

See also
1st AIBA Asian 2004 Olympic Qualifying Tournament
2nd AIBA Asian 2004 Olympic Qualifying Tournament

References
amateur-boxing

2004
Asian
Boxing
Sports in Palawan